Richard Mark Sainsbury (born 1943) is a British philosopher who is Professor of Philosophy at the University of Texas, Austin.  He is known for his work in philosophical logic, philosophy of language, and on the philosophies of Bertrand Russell and Gottlob Frege.

Education and career

Sainsbury earned his D.Phil. at Oxford University and taught for many years at King's College London where he was Susan Stebbing Professor of Philosophy.  He became professor of philosophy at the University of Texas at Austin in 2002. He was editor of the leading philosophy journal Mind from 1990 to 2000. He was elected a Fellow of the British Academy in 1998.

Books
Bertrand Russell (Routledge, 1979) ("Arguments of the Philosophers" series).
Paradoxes (Cambridge University Press, 1988).
Reference Without Referents (Oxford University Press, 2005).
Fiction and Fictionalism (Routledge, 2009).
Seven Puzzles of Thought and How to Solve Them: An Originalist Theory of Concepts (with Michael Tye) (Oxford University Press, 2012).
Thinking About Things (Oxford University Press, 2018) .

References

External links

Personal home page, with CV, book descriptions, and over 25 papers available for download.
Academia.edu page

1943 births
20th-century British philosophers
21st-century British philosophers
Philosophers of language
Living people
University of Texas at Austin faculty
Academics of King's College London
Fellows of King's College London
Fellows of Corpus Christi College, Oxford
Mark
Analytic philosophers
Fellows of the British Academy
Mind (journal) editors